The 1st century BC, also known as the last century BC and the last century BCE, started on the first day of 100 BC and ended on the last day of 1 BC. The AD/BC notation does not use a year zero; however, astronomical year numbering does use a zero, as well as a minus sign, so "2 BC" is equal to "year –1". 1st century AD (Anno Domini) follows.

In the course of the century, all the remaining independent lands surrounding the Mediterranean Sea were steadily brought under Roman control, being ruled either directly under governors or through puppet kings appointed by Rome. The Roman state itself was plunged into civil war several times, finally resulting in the marginalization of its 500-year-old Roman Republic, and the embodiment of total state power in a single man—the Roman emperor. 

The internal turbulence that plagued Rome at this time can be seen as the death throes of the Roman Republic, as it finally gave way to the autocratic ambitions of powerful men like Sulla, Julius Caesar, Mark Antony and Octavian. Octavian's ascension to total power as the emperor Augustus is considered to mark the point in history where the Roman Republic ends and the Roman Empire begins. Some scholars refer to this event as the Roman Revolution. The birth of Jesus, the central figure of Christianity, took place around the close of this century.

In the eastern mainland, the Han dynasty began to decline and the court of China was in chaos in the latter half of this century. Trapped in a difficult situation, the Xiongnu had to begin emigration to the west or attach themselves to the Han.

Events

90s BC

 97 BC: Ariarathes VIII is forced out of Cappadocia by Mithridates VI of Pontus, and dies soon afterwards.
 96 BC: Cyrene is left to the people of Rome by its ruler Ptolemy Apion.
 96 BC: King Alexander Jannaeus of Judea wins the Siege of Gaza.
 95 BC: Tigranes the Great becomes king of Armenia
 93 BC: Ariobarzanes I Philoromaios becomes king of Cappadocia with Roman backing.
 91 BC: The assassination of Marcus Livius Drusus leads to the Social War (91–87 BC) in Italy
 91 BC: Crown Prince Ju Revolt in China.

80s BC

 89 BC: Mithridates VI of Pontus's invasion of Cappadocia leads to the First Mithridatic War with the Roman Republic.
 89 BC: Valagamba of Anuradhapura gains control of all of Sri Lanka
 88 BC: 80,000 Roman civilians killed in the Asiatic Vespers in Asia Minor 
 87 BC: Emperor Wu of Han dies and is succeeded by his eight-year-old son Zhao, with Jin Midi, Shangguang Jie and Huo Guang as regents.
 88 BC: Sulla becomes the first Roman general in history to march on Rome
 87 BC: Civil war between the Roman consuls Cornelius Cinna and Octavius
 86 BC: Siege of Athens ends with Roman conquest of Athens.
 86 BC: The death of the regent of China Jin Midi unleashes the rivalry of his co-regents Shangguang Jie and Huo Guang.
 85 BC: Sulla defeats the forces of Mithridates VI in Greece at the Battle of Orchomenus
 85 BC: Aretas III of the Nabataeans conquers Damascus.
 83 BC: Sulla makes peace with Mithridates VI and marches on Rome.
 83-81 BC: Lucius Licinius Murena wages the Second Mithridatic War.
 82 BC: Sertorius flees from Sulla to North Africa via Hispania
 c.83 BC: Tigranes of Armenia takes control of Syria after the implosion of the Seleucid dynasty.
 81 BC: Sulla is appointed dictator of the Roman state, and brings about major reforms.
 80 BC: Sertorius invades Hispania and sets up his own regime, beginning the Sertorian War (80-72).
 80 BC: Conflict between the regents Shangguang Jie and Huo Guang results in the destruction of the Shangguang clan and Huo Guang becoming the de facto ruler of China.
 c.80 BC: Maues, King of the Sakas, conquers Gandhara and Taxila.

70s BC

 77 BC: Fu Jiezi assassinated the king of Loulan on behalf of the Han dynasty.
 c.75 BC: Kanva dynasty replaces the Shunga dynasty in Magadha.
 74 BC: Mithridates VI of Pontus disputes Nicomedes IV of Bithynia's bequest of his kingdom to the Roman Republic, beginning the Third Mithridatic War.
 74 BC: Emperor Zhao of Han dies and is succeeded by the unsuitable Prince He of Changyi and then by Xuan. Huo Guang continues to be de facto ruler of China.
 73 BC: A slave rebellion led by the escaped gladiator Spartacus leads to the Third Servile War.
 73-72 BC: Lucullus defeats Mithridates at Tenedos, Cyzicus, and the Rhyndacus and he flees east to Armenia
 71 BC: Pompey the Great ends the Sertorian War (restoring Roman control of Hispania) and the Third Servile War (restoring Roman control of southern Italy).
 71 BC: Wusun and China attack the Xiongnu.

60s BC
 69 BC: Lucullus invades Armenia (Battle of Tigranocerta) and reestablishes the Seleucids in Syria.
 68 BC: Pompey replaces Lucullus as leader of the Roman forces in the Third Mithridatic War.
 68 BC: Huo Guang dies and Emperor Xuan of Han assumes full power. The Huo clan is eliminated over the following two years.
 67 BC: Pompey is given a three-year extraordinary command against the pirates plaguing the Mediterranean and defeats them in forty days.
 66 BC: Pompey drives Mithridates VI out of Asia Minor (Battle of the Lycus).
 66 BC: Aristobulus II seizes power from John Hyrcanus II in Judea.
 63 BC: Mithridates VI commits suicide, ending the Third Mithridatic War.
 63 BC: Cicero denounces and defeats the Catilinarian conspiracy.
 63 BC: Pompey captures Jerusalem, and establishes Roman annexation of Judea as a client kingdom. He also permanently abolishes Seleucid Syria. Aristobulus II of Judea removed from power & John Hyrcanus II restored as Roman vassal.
 62 BC: Nabataean kingdom becomes a Roman vassal.
 61 BC: Orgetorix and the Helvetii's attempt to migrate into southwestern France leads Julius Caesar to take military action, beginning the Gallic Wars
 60 BC: Julius Caesar, Pompey, and Crassus form the First Triumvirate
 c. 60 BC: The Sakas conquer Mathura.

50s BC

 58 BC: Battle of Bibracte - Julius Caesar conquers the Helvetii
 58 BC: Germans invade Gaul and are defeated by Julius Caesar at Battle of Vosges (58 BC).
 58 BC: Clodius becomes the leading figure in Roman urban politics. Cicero goes into exile. 
 58 BC: Huhanye rebels against his distant cousin Woyanqudi Chanyu of the Xiongyu, beginning the Xiongnu civil war.
 57 BC: Julius Caesar invades and defeats the Belgae at the Battle of the Sabis.
 57 BC: Cicero recalled from exile through the machinations of Milo and his mob.
 57 BC: Silla is founded in southeastern Korea (traditional date according to Samguk Sagi, a 12th-century historical document).
 56 BC: Vikramaditya defeats the Sakas at Ujjain and founds the Vikram Samvat calendar era.
 55-54 BC: Caesar's invasions of Britain.
 54-53 BC: Ambiorix's revolt against Julius Caesar in Gaul.
 53 BC: The Parthians defeat the Romans under Crassus in the Battle of Carrhae, ending the First Triumvirate.
 53 BC: Clodius dies during mob violence in Rome. His followers burn down the Senate house.
 53 BC: Huhanye Chanyu of the Xiongnu become a Chinese vassal.
 52 BC: Pompey joins the Optimates and becomes sole Consul in Rome.
 52 BC: Vercingetorix's revolt in Gaul (Battle of Gergovia, Battle of Alesia).
51 BC: Siege of Uxellodunum marks the end of the Gallic Wars and the final Roman conquest of Gaul.
 Mid 1st century BC – East torana of the Great Stupa at Sanchi, is made. Early Andhra period. According to an inscription, it is sculpted by ivory carvers from the nearby town of Vidisha.

40s BC

 49 BC: Julius Caesar crosses the Rubicon river and takes the city of Rome, beginning Caesar's Civil War. 
 48 BC: Ptolemy XIII deposes his co-regent Cleopatra, beginning the Ptolemaic civil war in Egypt
 48 BC: Emperor Xuan of Han dies and is succeeded by his son Yuan. Wang Zhengjun is made Empress, as a result of which her clan would eventually topple the Han dynasty.
 48 BC: Julius Caesar decisively defeats Pompey at the Battle of Pharsalus.
 47 BC: Cleopatra restored to the Ptolemaic throne after the Battle of the Nile (47 BC)
 47 BC: Year of six kings in Anuradhapura in Sri Lanka 
 46 BC: Julius Caesar takes control of Africa at the Battle of Thapsus.
 46 BC: China abandons control of Hainan as a cost-cutting measure.
 45 BC: Julius Caesar wins the Battle of Munda, regaining control of Hispania and ending the Roman Civil War.
 44 BC: Julius Caesar named Dictator perpetuo
 44 BC: Julius Caesar re-founds Carthage and Corinth as Roman colonies.
 44 BC: Assassination of Julius Caesar on the Ides of March.
 43 BC: Octavian, Mark Antony, and Lepidus form the Second Triumvirate and take control of Rome.
 42 BC: Second Triumvirate defeats Julius Caesar's assassins at the Battle of Philippi
 41-40 BC: Lucius Antonius and Octavian fight the Perusine War 
 40 BC: Pacorus I conquers Roman Syria.

30s BC

 38 BC: Ventidius defeats the Parthians at the Battle of Mount Gindarus, reclaiming Roman Syria.
 37 BC: Herod the Great becomes king of Judea.
 37 BC: Mark Antony invades Parthia.
 37 BC: Goguryeo is founded in southern Manchuria (traditional date according to Samguk Sagi).
 36 BC: Battle of Naulochus: Second Triumvirate gains control of Sicily from the rebel Sextus Pompey.
 36 BC: Battle of Zhizhi: Gan Yanshou and Chen Tang launch an unauthorised expedition which prevents the Xiongnu from extending their power into Central Asia.
 34 BC: Cleopatra and Mark Antony perform the Donations of Alexandria.
 33 BC: Emperor Yuan of Han dies and is succeeded by his son Cheng. Empress Wang Zhengjun becomes Empress Dowager and her brother is placed in command of the armed forces and administration.
 32 BC: Disagreements between Octavian and Mark Antony cause the outbreak of the Final War of the Roman Republic.
 31 BC: Battle of Actium: Octavian defeats troops under Mark Antony and Cleopatra, becoming de facto ruler of the Roman empire.
 30 BC: Octavian annexes Egypt.
 c.30 BC: Satavahana dynasty replaces the Kanva dynasty in Magadha.

20s BC

 27 BC: The Roman Senate votes Octavian the title of Augustus. Augustus eventually assumes all authority formerly held by the Roman senate becoming the first emperor. This is traditionally taken as the end of the Roman Republic and the beginning of the Principate (27 BC-AD 235).
 25 BC: Galatia annexed by Rome after the death of Amyntas of Galatia.
 Second half of 1st century BC – Chaitya hall at Karli, India, Maharashtra, is made. Early Andhra period.

10s BC
 19 BC: Conclusion of major fighting in the Cantabrian Wars marks the end of the Roman conquest of Hispania
 18 BC: Baekje is founded in mid-western Korea (traditional date according to Samguk Sagi).
 16-13 BC: Augustus establishes the Rhine limes.
 Maison Carrée and Pont du Gard built.

0s BC
 9 BC: Pannonia annexed to the Roman empire by the future emperor Tiberius
 8 BC: Wang Mang becomes head of the Chinese armed forces and administration.
 7 BC: Emperor Cheng of Han dies and is succeeded by his nephew Ai. Empress Dowager Wang Zhengjun becomes Grand Empress Dowager and the Emperor's grandmother Consort Fu becomes Empress Dowager. Wang Mang resigns as head of the armed forces and administration. The reign is dominated by the destabilising intrigues of the Wang and Fu clans.
 c. 6 BC – 4 BC: Birth of Jesus of Nazareth (see Chronology of Jesus' birth and death, Anno Domini, and Common Era for further details).
 4 BC: Judea annexed to the Roman province of Syria after the death of King Herod.
 2 BC: Emperor Ai of Han appoints his unpopular homosexual lover Dong Xian as head of armed forces and administration.
 1 BC: Emperor Ai of Han dies and is succeeded by his eight year old cousin Ping. Wang Mang is appointed regent and begins wide-ranging reforms.

Significant people

Politics (and relatives of political figures)

 Marcus Aemilius Lepidus, Roman politician
 Agrippa, Roman statesman and general
 Ambiorix, prince of the Eburones, Gallic tribal chief
 Mark Antony, Roman general and politician
 Ariovistus, leader of the Suebi, Germanic tribal chief
 Augustus, Roman Emperor 
 Brutus, Roman politician
 Burebista, king of Dacia
 Cassivellaunus, Celtic Briton tribal chief
 Catiline, attempted to overthrow Roman Republic
 Cato the Younger, Roman politician
 Cleopatra VII of Egypt, Ruler of Egypt
 Publius Clodius Pulcher, Roman politician, demagogue
 Crassus, Roman general and politician
 Herod the Great, king of Judea
 Huo Guang, Chinese politician
 Juba II, last king of Numidia
 Julia the Elder, Roman noblewoman, wife of Agrippa and Tiberius
 Julius Caesar, Roman general and statesman
 Livia, Empress of Rome, mother of Tiberius
 Lucullus, Roman general and politician
 Maecenas, Roman politician and famous philanthropist
 Gaius Marius, Roman general and statesman
 Nalankilli, king of the early Chola dynasty in South India
 Octavia the Younger, Roman noblewoman, sister of Augustus and wife of Mark Antony. 
 Pompey, Roman general and politician
 Sextus Pompey, Roman general and son of Pompey
 Ptolemy XIII of Egypt, pharaoh of Egypt
 Sertorius, Roman statesman and general
 Sulla, Roman general and statesman
 Tigranes the Great, king of Armenia
 Vercingetorix, Gallic king and chieftain
 Xuan of Han, Chinese emperor

Religion

 Hillel the Elder, Jewish rabbi
 Jesus of Nazareth, The Son of God in various beliefs
 John the Baptist, Jewish prophet in Christianity and Islam
 Joseph, according to the New Testament the foster father of Jesus.
 Mary, according to the New Testament and the Quran the mother of Jesus.
 Zarmanochegas, Indian gymnosophist

Literature, science, and philosophy

 Aemilius Macer, Roman didactic poet
 Alfenus Varus, Roman jurist
 Afranius, Roman dramatist
 Antiochus of Ascalon, Syrian Greek philosopher
 Antipater of Thessalonica, Greek poet
 Apollonius of Citium, Cypriot Greek doctor
 Asinius Pollio, Roman poet and historian
 Asclepiodotus, Greek philosopher and writer on tactics
 Athenaeus Mechanicus, Greek writer on siege weapons
 Consort Ban, Chinese poet
 Calvus, Roman poet and orator
 Catullus, Roman poet 
 Cicero, Roman writer, philosopher and politician
 Cornelius Gallus, Roman poet and politician
 Cornelius Nepos, Roman biographer
 Crinagoras of Mytilene, Greek poet
 Didymus Chalcenterus, Alexandrian Greek grammarian
 Diodorus Siculus, Sicilian Greek historian
 Dionysius of Halicarnassus, Greek historian and grammarian
 Elephantis, Greek poet and medical writer
 Geminus, Rhodian Greek astronomer and mathematician
 Helvius Cinna, Roman poet
 Horace, Roman poet
 Huan Tan, Chinese poet, philosopher and politician
 Jing Fang, Chinese mathematician and music theorist
 Marcus Antistius Labeo, Roman jurist 
 Livy, Roman historian
 Liu Xiang, Chinese poet and librarian
 Liu Xin, Chinese astronomer, mathematician, and librarian
 Lucretius, Roman poet and philosopher
 Meleager of Gadara, Syrian Greek poet and anthologist
 Nigidius Figulus, Roman philosopher and polymath
 Ovid, Roman poet
 Parmenion, Greek poet
 Parthenius of Nicaea, Bithynian Greek poet and grammarian
 Philodemus, Syrian Greek poet and philosopher
 Lucius Pomponius, Roman dramatist
 Pompeius Trogus, Roman historian 
 Marcus Porcius Latro, Roman orator
 Posidonius, Syrian Greek philosopher, geographer, and polymath
 Propertius, Roman poet
 Rutilius Lupus, Roman rhetorician
 Publilius Syrus, Syrian/Roman poet and dramatist
 Sallust, Roman historian, politician
 Sima Qian, Chinese historian, father of Chinese historiography
 Sisenna, Roman historian
 Strabo, Pontian Greek geographer and historian
 Themison of Laodicea, Syrian Greek doctor, founder of Methodic school of medicine
 Tibullus, Roman poet 
 Tryphon, Alexandrian Greek grammarian
 Valerius Antias, Roman historian
 Varro, Roman polymath
 Verrius Flaccus, Roman grammarian
 Virgil, Roman poet
 Vitruvius, Roman writer, architect and engineer
 Wang Bao, Chinese poet
 Yang Xiong, Chinese poet and philosopher
 Sangam literature, ancient Tamil literary works.

Others

 Crixus, Gallic gladiator and rebel leader
 Jin Midi, Chinese official
 Spartacus, gladiator and insurgent leader of the Third Servile War

Inventions, discoveries, introductions

 The Antikythera mechanism is made.
The Chinese Ji Jiu Pian dictionary published in 40 BC during the Han Dynasty is the earliest known reference to the hydraulic-powered trip hammer device.
 36 BC: Maya numeral for Zero was written in Chiapa, it is the oldest zero in The Americas.

Sovereign states
See: List of sovereign states in the 1st century BC.

References

 
-9
-99